Waiau is a rural locality in the Western Bay of Plenty District of New Zealand. It is on the northern side of Tauranga Harbour, and is east and north from Waihi Beach and east of Athenree. Waiau River and  run through it.

William Wright Falls is a 28m waterfall on Orokawa Stream, in the northern part of the area, accessible by a walking track from Waihi Beach. The track passes through Orokawa Bay.

Demographics

Waiau had a population of 333 at the 2018 New Zealand census, an increase of 6 people (1.8%) since the 2013 census, and an increase of 57 people (20.7%) since the 2006 census. There were 123 households, comprising 171 males and 162 females, giving a sex ratio of 1.06 males per female. The median age was 48.2 years (compared with 37.4 years nationally), with 54 people (16.2%) aged under 15 years, 48 (14.4%) aged 15 to 29, 153 (45.9%) aged 30 to 64, and 75 (22.5%) aged 65 or older.

Ethnicities were 82.9% European/Pākehā, 28.8% Māori, 4.5% Pacific peoples, and 0.9% other ethnicities. People may identify with more than one ethnicity.

The percentage of people born overseas was 10.8, compared with 27.1% nationally.

Although some people chose not to answer the census's question about religious affiliation, 59.5% had no religion, 28.8% were Christian, 1.8% had Māori religious beliefs, 0.9% were Buddhist and 2.7% had other religions.

Of those at least 15 years old, 45 (16.1%) people had a bachelor's or higher degree, and 60 (21.5%) people had no formal qualifications. The median income was $28,900, compared with $31,800 nationally. 45 people (16.1%) earned over $70,000 compared to 17.2% nationally. The employment status of those at least 15 was that 126 (45.2%) people were employed full-time, 51 (18.3%) were part-time, and 3 (1.1%) were unemployed.

References

Western Bay of Plenty District
Populated places in the Bay of Plenty Region
Populated places around the Tauranga Harbour